King Abdullah Academy (KAA) is a Saudi Arabian international school located in Floris, an unincorporated area in Fairfax County, Virginia in the Washington, DC metropolitan area. In proximity to Herndon and Dulles International Airport, it serves ages 4–18, grades preschool through 12.

The academy opened in the fall of 2016. There were no hearings from the Fairfax County government required for the occupation of the campus because land which KAA occupied was already zoned for educational purposes. In 2015 Michael R. Frey, the Fairfax County Supervisor, stated that residents of the area around the school had not expressed opposition to its placement there.

Students in pre-school and elementary school (KG-5th Grade) are in co-gender classes while middle and high school students are non co gender.

See also

 American International School – Riyadh
 American International School of Jeddah
 List of things named after Saudi kings

References

External links
 King Abdullah Academy

High schools in Fairfax County, Virginia
Private K-12 schools in Virginia
International schools in the United States
Saudi Arabian international schools
2016 establishments in Virginia
Educational institutions established in 2016
Religious schools in Virginia
Islamic schools in the United States